The Women's 800 Freestyle event at the 11th FINA World Aquatics Championships swam 29 – 30 July 2005 in Montreal, Quebec, Canada. Preliminary heats were held in the Championships morning session on 29 July, with the top-8 finishers advancing to swim-again in the event's Final on 30 July.

At the start of the event, the existing World (WR) and Championships (CR) records were:
WR: 8:16.22, Janet Evans (USA), swum 20 August 1989 in Tokyo, Japan
CR: 8:23.66, Hannah Stockbauer (Germany), swum 26 July 2003 in Barcelona, Spain
Note: no new World or Championships records were set during this competition.

Results

Preliminary heats

Final heat

References

Swimming at the 2005 World Aquatics Championships
2005 in women's swimming